Bulbophyllum lasiochilum, commonly referred to as "The Shaggy Lipped Bulbophyllum", is a species of orchid in the genus Bulbophyllum. It is found in India, Myanmar, Thailand and Malaysia in wet or seasonally dry forests, and blooms in the fall.

References
The Bulbophyllum-Checklist
The Internet Orchid Species Photo Encyclopedia

lasiochilum